Robert Peter Lipski (born July 7, 1938) is a former Major League Baseball catcher.

Following his baseball career, Lipski, married, had two children, and worked as a Pennsylvania State Trooper in his hometown of Scranton, Pennsylvania.

External links

Major League Baseball catchers
Cleveland Indians players
Tampa Tarpons (1957–1987) players
Des Moines Demons players
Chattanooga Lookouts players
Buffalo Bisons (minor league) players
Arkansas Travelers players
Syracuse Chiefs players
Jacksonville Suns players
Vancouver Mounties players
York White Roses players
Baseball players from Pennsylvania
Sportspeople from Scranton, Pennsylvania
1938 births
Living people